Charles Alphonse du Fresnoy (1611 – 16 January 1668), French painter and writer on his art.

Du Fresnoy was born in Paris, son of an apothecary. He was destined for the medical profession, and well educated in Latin and Greek; but, having a natural propensity for the fine arts, he would not apply to his intended vocation, and was allowed to learn the rudiments of design under Perrier and Vouet. At the age of twenty-one he went off to Rome, with no resources; he drew ruins and architectural subjects.

After two years thus spent he re-encountered his old fellow-student Pierre Mignard, and by his aid obtained some amelioration of his professional prospects. He studied Raphael and the antique, went in 1633 to Venice, and in 1656 returned to France. During two years he was now employed in painting altar-pieces in the château du Raincy, landscapes, etc. His death was caused by an attack of apoplexy followed by palsy; he died at Villiers-le-Bel, near Paris. He never married.

His pictorial works are few; they are correct in drawing, with something of the Caracci in design, and of Titian in colouring, but wanting fire and expression, and insufficient to keep his name in any eminent repute.

He is remembered now almost entirely as a writer rather than painter. His Latin poem, De arte graphica, was written during his Italian sojourn, and embodied his observations on the art of painting; it may be termed a critical treatise on the practice of the art, with general advice to students. The precepts are sound according to the standard of his time; the poetical merits slender enough. The Latin style is formed chiefly on Lucretius and Horace.

This poem was first published by Mignard, and has been translated into several languages. In 1668 it was turned into French by Roger de Piles; Dryden translated the work into English prose; and a rendering into verse by Mason followed, to which Sir Joshua Reynolds added some annotations.

References

1611 births
1668 deaths
17th-century French painters
French male painters